DNA oxidative demethylase (alkylated DNA repair protein, alpha-ketoglutarate-dependent dioxygenase ABH1, alkB (gene)) is an enzyme with systematic name methyl DNA-base, 2-oxoglutarate:oxygen oxidoreductase (formaldehyde-forming). This enzyme catalyses the following chemical reaction

 DNA-base-CH3 + 2-oxoglutarate + O2  DNA-base + formaldehyde + succinate + CO2

DNA oxidative demethylase contains iron; activity is somewhat stimulated by ascorbate.

References

External links 

EC 1.14.11